Leon Renfroe Meadows (April 14, 1884 – March 6, 1953) was the second president at East Carolina Teachers College.  On October 5, 1934, he moved from the summer school director to the president, succeeding Robert Herring Wright.

External links 
 Meadows biography

Presidents of East Carolina University
1884 births
1953 deaths
People from LaFayette, Alabama
20th-century American academics